Mendiola is a surname. Notable people with the surname include:

Christopher Mendiola (born 1990), Guam footballer
Dennis Mendiola, American investment banker and chief executive
Jessy Mendiola (born 1992), Filipino actress
Jim Mendiola, American screenwriter and film director
Joseph M. Mendiola, Northern Mariana Islands politician
Raúl Mendiola (born 1994), Mexican footballer